David Adleson is an American music critic, journalist and writer and has served as a producer and music correspondent for E! News since 1992, reporting on music trends, events and issues, Adleson was also a panelist on the VH1 series Four on the Floor.

References

External links

Living people
American male non-fiction writers
American music critics
American television journalists
American television producers
Year of birth missing (living people)